Völgy Lovagjai Rögbi SE (Valley Knights) is a Hungarian rugby club in Alcsútdoboz. They do not currently play in a league.

History
The club was founded in 2010.

External links
  Völgy Lovagjai Rögbi SE

Hungarian rugby union teams
Rugby clubs established in 2010